Val Verde (Spanish for "Green Valley") is an unincorporated community in the southeastern Topatopa Mountains foothills, and in northwestern Los Angeles County, California. The unincorporated community of Valencia and the city of Santa Clarita are east of the community. Its population was 2,468 at the 2010 census, up from 1,472 at the 2000 census. For statistical purposes the Census Bureau has defined Val Verde as a census-designated place (CDP).

History
Originally the settlement of Val Verde was a short-lived boom town built by colonial Mexican settlers near a gold strike in 19th-century Alta California.

In 1924, the modern settlement was founded by  Sidney P. Dones and other investors. It was named Eureka Villa.  That settlement was designed as a resort community for African Americans, as in that period, African Americans were frequently barred from public beaches and swimming pools.  The town became known as the "Black Palm Springs". By the 1930s, the area was wildly popular, mainly because it was one of only a few places blacks could go for recreation.

Other Southern California destinations included Lake Elsinore reservoir in Riverside County, a section of Venice Beach, Bruce's Beach in the South Bay, and a park in Pasadena only open to blacks one day a year.

In 1939, the cornerstone for the Olympic swimming pool was laid.  In the 1994 Northridge earthquake, the original pool was damaged and has since been repaired and shortened.  The pool is part of the Los Angeles County Park system.  It opens late spring until early fall.  Day and evening swimming sessions occur daily.

With the advent of civil-rights reforms in the 1960s, many African Americans moved out of the area for larger areas from which they were previously segregated.  The town now has a large percentage of Latinos and Whites. The 1994 Northridge earthquake wreaked tremendous havoc on the town, damaging most of the original structures.

In 2011, Verizon Wireless attempted to build a 30,000 watt, 12-panel antenna array cell site in Val Verde, less than 50 ft from an adjacent residence.  Verizon Wireless and its contractor claimed that the main reason for the cell site was for community of Val Verde, but inquiries were made and the cell site is designed to fill coverage holes in the adjacent Valencia Commerce Center industrial park, Hasley Hills housing tract, and for future developments outside of Val Verde.  Local residents banded together and protested the cell site, claiming that big business was trying to run rampant over the little community of Val Verde.  As of early 2013, Verizon Wireless has not built the cell tower, and has decided to build the tower on a hillside away from homes.

On May 16, 2017, the Los Angeles County Sheriff's Department seized 7,000 cockfighting birds at a ranch on Jackson Street in Val Verde. Although  2,700 birds had been seized from the same location in 2007, the 2017 raid was the "largest cockfighting bust in U.S. history" according to The Los Angeles Times, while the sheriff department said it was, "one of the largest seizures of flying fowl used for illegal cockfighting and (for) breeding for illegal cockfighting purposes." However, the owner was not arrested.

Geography

Demographics

2010
At the 2010 census Val Verde had a population of 2,468. The racial makeup of Val Verde was 1,404 (56.9%) White (29.9% Non-Hispanic White), 105 (4.3%) African American, 26 (1.1%) Native American, 48 (1.9%) Asian, 1 (0.0%) Pacific Islander, 732 (29.7%) from other races, and 152 (6.2%) from two or more races. Hispanic or Latino of any race were 1,507 persons (61.1%).

The census reported that 2,466 people (99.9% of the population) lived in households, 2 (0.1%) lived in non-institutionalized group quarters, and no one was institutionalized.

Of the 671 households, 331 (49.3%) had children under 18 living in them, 404 (60.2%) were opposite-sex married couples living together, 87 (13.0%) had a female householder with no husband present, and 43 (6.4%) had a male householder with no wife present.  There were 37 (5.5%) unmarried opposite-sex partnerships, and 1 (0.1%) same-sex married couples or partnerships. 90 households (13.4%) were one person and 22 (3.3%) had someone living alone who was 65 or older. The average household size was 3.68.  There were 534 families (79.6% of households); the average family size was 4.00.

The age distribution was 706 people (28.6%) under 18, 288 people (11.7%) aged 18 to 24, 726 people (29.4%) aged 25 to 44, 624 people (25.3%) aged 45 to 64, and 124 people (5.0%) who were 65 or older.  The median age was 31.7 years. For every 100 females, there were 102.1 males.  For every 100 females age 18 and over, there were 106.1 males.

There were 715 housing units at an average density of 278.7 per square mile, of the occupied units 521 (77.6%) were owner-occupied and 150 (22.4%) were rented. The homeowner vacancy rate was 3.2%; the rental vacancy rate was 2.6%.  1,873 people (75.9% of the population) lived in owner-occupied housing units and 593 people (24.0%) lived in rental housing units.

According to the 2010 United States Census, Val Verde had a median household income of $58,971, with 18.6% of the population living below the federal poverty line.

2000
At the 2000 census there were 1,472 people, 424 households, and 318 families in the CDP. The population density was 4,428.8 inhabitants per square mile (1,722.2/km). The racial makeup of the CDP was 55.98% White, 4.28% African American, 0.68% Native American, 1.63% Asian, 0.20% Pacific Islander, 33.22% from other races, and 4.01% from two or more races. Hispanic or Latino of any race were 51.63%.

Of the 424 households, 50.2% had children under the age of 18 living with them, 58.3% were married couples living together, 9.7% had a female householder with no husband present, and 25.0% were not families. About 16.0% of households were one person, and 2.1% were one person aged 65 or older.  The average household size was 3.47, and the average family size was 3.89.

The age distribution was 33.4% under the age of 18, 12.4% from 18 to 24, 36.0% from 25 to 44, 15.0% from 45 to 64, and 3.2% 65 or older.  The median age was 27 years. For every 100 females, there were 105.3 males.  For every 100 females age 18 and over, there were 107.2 males.

The median household income was $52,593 and the median family income  was $53,843. Males had a median income of $30,583 versus $24,861 for females. The per capita income for the CDP was $15,626.  About 3.6% of families and 6.4% of the population were below the poverty line, including none of those under age 18 and 37.1% of those age 65 or over.

Government

Val Verde has a civic association of volunteers, the Val Verde Civic Association (VVCA), which is the liaison between the LA County 5th District Supervisor, community leaders and the residents.  The VVCA is a 501(c)(4) non-profit corporation and has an elected six member Board of Directors with up to three appointed Associate Board Members. Monthly meetings are held on the second Thursday of every month at 7 pm in the community clubhouse.  Guest speakers give presentations to the community regarding issues from fire safety, CERT, Department of Public Works, Deputies from the Supervisor's office and the Sheriff's office, CHP updates and the Waterworks District.  Residents have the opportunity to learn about the community and to voice their opinions.

Chiquita Canyon provided its 2015 annual grant of over $350,000 to the Val Verde Community Benefits Funding Committee (CBFC) as part of its 1997 Agreement with Val Verde. The Val Verde community has received funds from Chiquita for over 15 years. The CBFC provides funding from the landfill to support after-school programs, tutoring, scholarships, bus passes, groceries for needy families, youth sports programs, etc. all for Val Verde residents.

Val Verde has two seats on the Castaic Area Town Council (CATC).  The CATC is the liaison between the LA County 5th District Supervisor, community leaders and the residents of the 5 areas of Castaic.  The CATC holds a meeting every third Wednesday of the month at 6:30 pm at the Castaic School District Office.  Residents are invited to attend the meeting, as local officials make presentations to the Board and the audience.

See also

Del Valle, California

References

Census-designated places in Los Angeles County, California
Topatopa Mountains
Populated places established in the 1920s
1920s establishments in California
Santa Clarita, California
Census-designated places in California
African-American history of California